Today and Yesterday is a 1975 series of three plays for children by Alasdair Gray about life in nineteenth century Scotland, commissioned by Malcolm Hossack of Scottish BBC Educational Television. 
The plays show a TV presenter traveling in time to contrast the 1970s with the Victorian era, and, although written for a school audience, include many of Gray's political interests. Some of the themes covered in the series would return in Gray's Victorian novel Poor Things.

Episodes
The text for two episodes, The Streets and The School is available in the archives of the National Library of Scotland, Acc. 9247/29.  Episode three, Industry, has been lost.

References

Scottish plays
1975 plays
Plays set in Scotland
Victorian era in popular culture